On Nature (Περὶ Φύσεως, Peri Physeos) is the name of several works of ancient philosophy:

 On Nature (Anaximander)
 On Nature (Empedocles)
 On Nature (Epicurus)
 On Nature (Heraclitus)
 On Nature (Melissus)
 On Nature (Parmenides)
 On Nature (Philolaus)
 On Nature (Zeno)

See also
 Physis, a Greek philosophical, theological, and scientific term, usually translated into English as 'nature'
Pseudo-Zeno